Films produced in Sri Lanka in the 1960s.

1960

1961

1962

1963

1964

1965

1966

1967

1968

1969

See also
 Cinema of Sri Lanka
 List of Sri Lankan films

1960s
Films
Sri Lanka